Lemyra sikkimensis is a moth of the family Erebidae. It was described by Frederic Moore in 1879. It is found in India (western Bengal, Assam, Khasi Hills) and China.

References

 

sikkimensis
Moths described in 1879